Maurizio Bufalini (4 June 1787 – 31 March 1875) was an Italian physician. He served in the Senate of the Kingdom of Sardinia. He was a recipient of the Order of Saints Maurice and Lazarus.

References

External links
 

1787 births
1875 deaths
19th-century Italian physicians
Members of the Senate of the Kingdom of Sardinia
Recipients of the Order of Saints Maurice and Lazarus